Muslim Baýramovich Agaýew (born 29 April 1974) is a Turkmenistani professional football player.

External links
 
 Career stats at KLISF

1974 births
Living people
People from Mary, Turkmenistan
Soviet footballers
Turkmenistan footballers
Turkmenistan international footballers
Turkmenistan expatriate footballers
Turkmenistan expatriate sportspeople in Kazakhstan
Turkmenistan expatriate sportspeople in Ukraine
Expatriate footballers in Kazakhstan
Expatriate footballers in Ukraine
Footballers at the 1998 Asian Games
FC Kremin Kremenchuk players
FC Nyva Ternopil players
FC Irtysh Pavlodar players
Ukrainian Premier League players
Kazakhstan Premier League players
Turkmenistan football managers
Association football forwards
Asian Games competitors for Turkmenistan